A central problem in algorithmic graph theory is the shortest path problem. Hereby, the problem of finding the shortest path between every pair of nodes is known as all-pair-shortest-paths (APSP) problem. As sequential algorithms for this problem often yield long runtimes, parallelization has shown to be beneficial in this field. In this article two efficient algorithms solving this problem are introduced.

Another variation of the problem is the single-source-shortest-paths (SSSP) problem, which also has parallel approaches: Parallel single-source shortest path algorithm.

Problem definition
Let  be a directed Graph with the set of nodes  and the set of edges . Each edge  has a weight  assigned. The goal of the all-pair-shortest-paths problem is to find the shortest path between all pairs of nodes of the graph. For this path to be unique it is required that the graph does not contain cycles with a negative weight.

In the remainder of the article it is assumed that the graph is represented using an adjacency matrix. We expect the output of the algorithm to be a distancematrix .

The Floyd algorithm presented later can handle negative edge weights, whereas the Dijkstra algorithm requires all edges to have a positive weight.

Dijkstra algorithm 

The Dijkstra algorithm originally was proposed as a solver for the single-source-shortest-paths problem. However, the algorithm can easily be used for solving the All-Pair-Shortest-Paths problem by executing the Single-Source variant with each node in the role of the root node.

In pseudocode such an implementation could look as follows:
  1    func DijkstraSSSP(G,v) {
  2        ... //standard SSSP-implementation here
  3        return dv;
  4    }
  5    
  6    func DijkstraAPSP(G) {
  7        D := |V|x|V|-Matrix
  8        for i from 1 to |V| {
  9           //D[v] denotes the v-th row of D
  10          D[v] := DijkstraSSP(G,i)
  11       }
  12   }

In this example we assume that DijkstraSSSP takes the graph  and the root node  as input.
The result of the execution in turn is the distancelist . In , the -th element stores the distance from the root node  to the node .
Therefore the list  corresponds exactly to the -th row of the APSP distancematrix .

Parallelization for up to |V| processors

A trivial parallelization can be obtained by parallelizing the loop of DijkstraAPSP in line8.
However, when using the sequential DijkstraSSSP this limits the number of processors to be used by the number of iterations executed in the loop.
Therefore, for this trivial parallelization  is an upper bound for the number of processors.

For example, let the number of processors  be equal to the number of nodes . This results in each processor executing DijkstraSSSP exactly once in parallel.
However, when there are only for example  processors available, each processor has to execute DijkstraSSSP twice.

Consequently, the efficiency of this parallelization is perfect: Employing  processors reduces the runtime by the factor .

Another benefit of this parallelization is that no communication between the processors is required. However, it is required that every processor has enough local memory to store the entire adjacency matrix of the graph.

Parallelization for more than |V| processors

If more than  processors shall be used for the parallelization, it is required that multiple processors take part of the DijkstraSSSP computation. For this reason, the parallelization is split across into two levels.

For the first level the processors are split into  partitions.
Each partition is responsible for the computation of a single row of the distancematrix . This means each partition has to evaluate one DijkstraSSSP execution with a fixed root node.
With this definition each partition has a size of   processors. The partitions can perform their computations in parallel as the results of each are independent of each other. Therefore, the parallelization presented in the previous section corresponds to a partition size of 1 with  processors.

The main difficulty is the parallelization of multiple processors executing DijkstraSSSP for a single root node. The idea for this parallelization is to distribute the management of the distancelist  in DijkstraSSSP within the partition.

The DijkstraSSSP algorithm mainly consists of the repetition of two steps: First, the nearest node  in the distancelist  has to be found. For this node the shortest path already has been found.

These steps have to be altered as follows because for the parallelization  has been distributed across the partition:
 Each processor owns a part of : Each processor scans for the local minimum  in his part, for example using linear search.
 Broadcast the global minimum  to all nodes in the partition.
 Every processors now knows the global nearest node  and its distance.
	
The total runtime of such an iteration of DijkstraSSSP performed by a partition of size  can be derived based on the performed subtasks:
 The linear search for : 
 Broadcast- and Reduce-operations: These can be implemented efficiently for example using binonmialtrees.
After substituting the definition of  this yields the total runtime for DijkstraAPSP: .

The main benefit of this parallelization is that it is not required anymore that every processor stores the entire adjacency matrix.
Instead, it is sufficient when each processor within a partition only stores the columns of the adjacency matrix of the nodes for which he is responsible.
A downside, however, is that this parallelization comes with a communication overhead due to the reduce- and broadcast-operations.

Example
The graph used in this example is the one presented in the image with four nodes.

The goal is to compute the distancematrix with  processors.
For this reason, the processors are divided into four partitions with two processors each.
For the illustration we focus on the partition which is responsible for the computation of the shortest paths from node A to all other nodes.
Let the processors of this partition be named p1 and p2.

The computation of the distancelist across the different iterations is visualized in the second image.

The top row in the image corresponds to  after the initialization, the bottom one to  after the termination of the algorithm.
The nodes are distributed in a way that p1 is responsible for the nodes A and B, while p2 is responsible for C and D.
The distancelist  is distributed according to this.
For the second iteration the subtasks executed are shown explicitly in the image:
 Computation of the local minimum node in 
 Computation of the globalminimum node in  through a reduce operation
 Broadcast of the global minimum node in 
 Marking of the global nearest node as "finished" and adjusting the distance of its neighbors

Floyd algorithm 

The Floyd algorithm solves the All-Pair-Shortest-Paths problem for directed graphs. With the adjacency matrix of a graph as input, it calculates shorter paths iterative. After |V| iterations the distance-matrix contains all the shortest paths. The following describes a sequential version of the algorithm in pseudo code:

  1    func Floyd_All_Pairs_SP(A) {
  2         = A;
  3        for k := 1 to n do
  4            for i := 1 to n do
  5                for j := 1 to n do
  6                    
  7     }

Where A is the adjacency matrix, n = |V| the number of nodes and D the distance matrix. For a more detailed description of the sequential algorithm look up Floyd–Warshall algorithm.

Parallelization

The basic idea to parallelize the algorithm is to partition the matrix and split the computation between the processes. Each process is assigned to a specific part of the matrix. A common way to achieve this is 2-D Block Mapping. Here the matrix is partitioned into squares of the same size and each square gets assigned to a process. For an -matrix and p processes each process calculates a   sized part of the distance matrix. For  processes each would get assigned to exactly one element of the matrix. Because of that the parallelization only scales to a maximum of  processes.

As the calculation of the parts of the distance matrix is dependent on results from other parts the processes have to communicate between each other and exchange data.

Additionally each process needs a part of the k-th row and the k-th column of the  matrix. The  element holds a process in the same row and the  element holds a process in the same column as the process that wants to compute . Each process that calculated a part of the k-th row in the  matrix has to send this part to all processes in its column. Each process that calculated a part of the k-th column in the  matrix has to send this part to all processes in its row. All this processes have to do a one-to-all-broadcast operation along the row or the column. The data dependencies are illustrated in the image below.

For the 2-D block mapping we have to modify the algorithm as follows:

  1    func Floyd_All_Pairs_Parallel() {
  2      for k := 1 to n do{
             broadcasts it to the  processes;
             broadcasts it to the  processes;
  5          Each process waits to receive the needed segments;
  6          Each process computes its part of the  matrix;
  7          }
  8     }

In line 5 of the algorithm we have a synchronisation step to ensure that all processes have the data necessary to compute the next iteration. To improve the runtime of the algorithm we can remove the synchronisation step without affecting the correctness of the algorithm. To achieve that each process starts the computation as soon as it has the data necessary to compute its part of the matrix. This version of the algorithm is called pipelined 2-D block mapping.

Runtime

The runtime of the sequential algorithm is determined by the triple nested for loop. The computation in line 6 can be done in constant time.

2-D block mapping
The runtime of the parallelized algorithm consists of two parts. The time for the computation and the part for communication and data transfer between the processes.

In each iteration of the algorithm there is a one-to-all broadcast operation performed along the row and column of the processes. There are  elements broadcast. Afterwards there is a synchronisation step performed. How much time these operations take is highly dependent on the architecture of the parallel system used.

For the whole algorithm we have the following runtime:

Pipelined 2-D block mapping
For the runtime of the data transfer between the processes in the pipelined version of the algorithm we assume that a process can transfer k elements to a neighbouring process in  time. In every step there are  elements of a row or a column send to a neighbouring process. Such a step takes  time. After  steps the relevant data of the first row and column arrive at process  (in  time).

The values of successive rows and columns follow after time  in a pipelined mode. Process  finishes its last computation after O() + O() time.

The overall runtime for the pipelined version of the algorithm is:

References

Bibliography
 Grama, A.: Introduction to parallel computing. Pearson Education, 2003.
 Kumar, V.: Scalability of Parallel Algorithms for the All-Pairs Shortest-Path Problem. Journal of Parallel and Distributed Programming 13, 1991.
 Foster, I.: Designing and Building Parallel Programs (Online).
 Bindell, Fall: Parallel All-Pairs Shortest Paths Applications of Parallel Computers, 2011.

Graph algorithms